Wesley dos Santos Rodrigues (born 2 April 1992), commonly known as Wesley, is a Brazilian footballer who currently plays as a defender for Nam Định.

Career statistics

Club

Notes

References

1992 births
Living people
Brazilian footballers
Brazilian expatriate footballers
Association football defenders
Coritiba Foot Ball Club players
Rio Branco Sport Club players
Marília Atlético Clube players
Parnahyba Sport Club players
Botafogo Futebol Clube (PB) players
Ypiranga Futebol Clube players
Maringá Futebol Clube players
Global Makati F.C. players
Davao Aguilas F.C. players
Esporte Clube São Bento players
Brazilian expatriate sportspeople in the Philippines
Expatriate footballers in the Philippines